Henry Jay Owens (born April 23, 1979 in Miami, Florida) is an American former professional baseball player. A pitcher, Owens played in Major League Baseball for the New York Mets in 2006 and the Florida Marlins in 2007. He bats and throws right-handed.

Amateur career
Owens graduated from G. Holmes Braddock High School in Miami and attended Barry University. He played catcher as an amateur. He planned to attend medical school but scouts noticed his exceptional throwing skills and encouraged him to take up pitching.

Professional career
Owens was signed by the Pittsburgh Pirates as an undrafted free agent in June . In , an elbow injury hampered his performance. As a result, the Pirates left him unprotected and he was selected by the New York Mets in the minor league phase of the Rule 5 Draft.

In , after four years in the Single-A leagues, Owens was promoted to the Double-A Binghamton Mets where he was outstanding as a closer. He compiled 51 strikeouts while allowing only eight hits in 25 innings pitched before his promotion to the major leagues.

He made his major league debut on July 7, for the New York Mets. He pitched a perfect ninth inning in a 7-3 Mets loss to the Florida Marlins. On November 20, 2006, the Mets traded Owens, along with Matt Lindstrom to the Florida Marlins for lefties Jason Vargas and Adam Bostick.

2007 season
Owens started the season as a late-inning reliever, but was looked at as a closing option during spring training. Owens made it clear that he coveted the closer job very early on. After newly acquired reliever Jorge Julio proved to be ineffective as the club's closer, Owens became a candidate for the closer role.

On May 11, Owens was placed on the disabled list with right shoulder rotator cuff tendinitis. Later in the season, Owens was shut down, and ultimately underwent shoulder surgery.

References

External links

Winter Wonders by Chris Kline, Baseball America, January 5, 2005

1979 births
Living people
Baseball players from Miami
Major League Baseball pitchers
New York Mets players
Florida Marlins players
Gulf Coast Pirates players
Williamsport Crosscutters players
Hickory Crawdads players
Lynchburg Hillcats players
St. Lucie Mets players
Jupiter Hammerheads players
Barry Buccaneers baseball players
Baseball players suspended for drug offenses
American sportspeople in doping cases
Jacksonville Suns players
Binghamton Mets players